Amos Morris-Reich is a scholar whose research intersects modern Jewish history and the history of modern science and technology.

Books and research 
Amos Morris-Reich's book Photography and Jewish History: Five Twentieth Century Cases (Philadelphia: UPENN, 2022) turns to five twentieth-century cases in which photography and Jewish history intersect: Albert Kahn’s utopian attempt to establish a photographic archive in Paris in order to advance world peace; the spectacular failed project of Helmar Lerski, the most prominent photographer in British Mandate Jewish Palestine, on “Jewish and Arab types”; photography in the long career of Eugen Fischer, a Nazi professor of genetics; the street photography of Robert Frank; and Solomon Yudovin's photographs in S. An-sky’s attempt to introduce photography into the study of Russian Jewry prior to World War I, as seen from the post-Holocaust perspective of the early twenty-first century. Photography and Jewish History attempts to move the discussion of photography and Jewish history nexus from Jewish visibility and Jewish photographers to the political categories and registers of twentieth-century Jewish history.

In his book Race and Photography: Racial Photography as Scientific Evidence, 1876-1980 (Chicago: The University of Chicago Press, 2016), Morris-Reich attempted to return photography and photographic techniques and methods used in the study of “race” in a variety of scientific fields and disciplines back into the history of science. Approaching the history of scientific racial photography from an historical epistemology point of view, as forms of scientific evidence, Morris-Reich examines numerous scientists and scholars, both prominent and obscure, who developed photographic methods and techniques for the study of race or made methodical use of photography for its study. His reconstruction of individual cases, conceptual genealogies, and emergent patterns points to the diversity of and transformations in the scientific status of photography as evidence from the late nineteenth and early twentieth centuries through the Weimar and Nazi periods, and beyond, from physical anthropology to phenomenology.

In his book The Quest for Jewish Assimilation in Modern Social Science (New York: Routledge, 2008), Morris-Reich explores the connections between academic disciplines and notions of Jewish assimilation which, implicitly, pointed to the future trajectory of the Jewish minority in modern societies. Focusing on two influential "assimilated" Jewish authors—anthropologist Franz Boas and sociologist Georg Simmel—this comparative study shows that the respective epistemological and ontological assumptions, considerations, and expectations of anthropology and sociology underlie the respective evaluations of the Jews’ assimilation outcome in German and American societies as a form of "group extinction" in anthropology or as a form of “in-between situation” in sociology.

Morris-Reich has also co-edited (with Dirk Rupnow), Ideas of “Race” in the History of the Humanities (New York: Palgrave, 2017) and (with Margaret Olin), Photography and Imagination (New York: Routledge, 2019). He edited the first collection of essays by Georg Simmel in Hebrew: Georg Simmel: "How is Society Possible?" and Other Essays (Tel Aviv: Ha-kibutz ha-meuchad, 2012) and the first collection of essays by Sander Gilman in Hebrew: The Jewish Body and Other Protruding Organs: A Selection of Essays by Sander Gilman (Tel Aviv: Resling, 2015).  

With a special interest in the history of methodology and epistemology, Morris-Reich has also published numerous articles on the conceptual history of the social sciences, history of antisemitism and racism, Jewish cultural history, history of photography, and biologically oriented human sciences. At the Cohn Institute for the History and Philosophy of the Science and Ideas his teaching and supervision focus on the history and philosophy of the social and human sciences, history and philosophy of photography and technology, and historical contingency and counterfactuals.

References 

Historians of Jews and Judaism

Living people

Year of birth missing (living people)
Academic staff of Tel Aviv University
Hebrew University of Jerusalem alumni
Male non-fiction writers
Israeli historians
Israeli non-fiction writers